Humak is also the name of the Union Council governing this town, as well as the nearby Kotha Kalan and NaizianModel Town Humak is a suburb town of Islamabad, Pakistan started in 1984. Located in Islamabad Capital Territory on Kahuta Road, Model Town is situated on Humak village land near the Swaan River.

The area was formerly a jungle. According to the District Rawalpindi'' gazette of 1893, Humak was on the main railway line from Jhelum to Rawalpindi; those lines have since been relocated. The community now has more than 1500 homes laid out in an organised way, following the map provided by Capital Development Authority.

Sectors 
Model Town Humak has three sectors:
 Humak Sharqi (Eastern Humak)
 Humak Gharbi (Western Humak)
 Humak Zimni (Humak extension)
Schools and mosques are abundant throughout the town, with one in Humak Zimni being particularly prominent due to its large graveyard.

"Children Welfare School" is one of the government schools responsible for educating and training of children up to age seven.

Humak Sharqi 
Humak Sharqui is located on the eastern entrance to the town and is the oldest sector. The area is mostly residential, having very few commercial areas.

Humak Gharbi 
The western region of Humak is mostly commercial. There are also two government schools. There is also main Quba market in Humak Gharbi sector. Some main shops in Quba Market are, Al Madina Cloth House, Waleed General Store, and Masha Allah General Store .

Humak Zimni 
This sector was developed after the above-mentioned sectors as an extension of Humak. Its back coincides with the "Defence Housing Authority phase II" (DHA-II). In addition to the graveyard, there is a community centre with a municipal park in development.
Zayneb Hospital is a private hospital of the area providing all health amenities including lab, operation theater and women-child healthcare facilities.
There is a public park known as Humak park.

Humak industrial area 
A separate area of Humak constitutes several industrial anchors.5%factory are increased. Some of the Humak industries are as follows:
 Swana International (Pvt) Ltd.
 Coca-Cola Beverages Pakistan Limited
 AMSON Vaccines & PHARMA
 Ampak Enterprises
 Pepsi factory
 Coca-Cola Distribution
  Malik ice factory
 Punjab Oil Mills
 Yamaha (former)
 Sheena textile (pvt) Ltd.
 Hico Icecram's warehouse.
 Creative Electronics & Automation
 East West Infiniti (pvt) Ltd.
 Patrotrade operations office
 Ageco (Pvt) Ltd. (Economia)
 Bio Labs (pvt) Ltd
 Global Pharmaceuticals (pvt) Ltd.

Demographics 
Most of Humak's residents are Muslims. However, non-Muslims also live in the region.  A large number of residents are educated and are professionals in different fields.

Nature

Birds 

Pied kingfisher
House sparrow
Common myna
Common kingfisher
Common buzzard
Black drongo
House crow
Common babbler
Oriental magpie robin
Red-vented bulbul
Hoopoe
Rose-ringed parakeet
Spotted dove
Eurasian collared dove
Cattle egret
Little egret
Common swift
Little green bee-eater

Plants 
Cannabis sativa (Bheng)
Ficus pumila

Insects 
Dragonfly

Politics 
First Union Council election in Model Town was held in 2017, chaired by Qazi Faisal Naeem.

Problems 
Uncleanliness and illegal shops are the major problems of Model Town. One of the biggest problems was the damaged Kahuta/Sehala road. The road has been constructed but it only consists of a singly two lane road. After the construction of the road, the biggest emerging problem is constant parking of trucks and trailers on both side of road which makes it congested and unsafe.

During the construction of Kahuta/Sehala road, the heavy traffic used the inner roads of Model Town as alternative route which destroyed the inner roads of Model Town.

See also 
 Pakistan
 Islamabad Capital Territory
 Capital Development Authority

Populated places established in 1984
Union councils of Islamabad Capital Territory
Planned communities